Oszkár Szigeti (10 September 1933 – 6 May 1983) is a Hungarian football defender who played for Hungary in the 1958 FIFA World Cup. He also played for Diósgyőri VTK.

References

External links
 FIFA profile

1933 births
Hungarian footballers
Hungary international footballers
Association football defenders
Diósgyőri VTK players
1958 FIFA World Cup players
Sportspeople from Miskolc
1983 deaths